Wang Wei is a former Chinese female short track speed skater. She is a two-time silver medallist of the World Team Championships and a two-time bronze medallist of the 2005 Winter Universiade. During the 2002–03 World Cup season, Wang won two races at the World Cup stage in Salt Lake City. She also achieved one podium during the 2003–04 World Cup season in Jeonju. She won the 1500 m race and finished second in the 1000 m race at the 2004–05 World Cup's stage in Saguenay.

References

External links
 Profile at www.shorttrackonline.info

Date of birth missing (living people)
Living people
Chinese female short track speed skaters
21st-century Chinese women
Universiade medalists in short track speed skating
Medalists at the 2005 Winter Universiade
Year of birth missing (living people)
Universiade bronze medalists for China